Evelyn Nigel Chetwode Birch, Baron Rhyl  (18 November 1906 – 8 March 1981) was a British Conservative politician.

The son of General Sir Noel Birch and his wife Florence Chetwode, Nigel Birch was educated at Eton. He was a partner in Cohen Laming Hoare until May 1939 when he retired to study politics. He served in World War II in the King's Royal Rifle Corps and on General Staff, being promoted to the rank of Lieutenant-Colonel in 1944. He was appointed an Officer of the Order of the British Empire (OBE) in 1945.

He was Conservative Member of Parliament for Flintshire from 1945 to 1950 and for West Flintshire from 1950 to 1970. He served in government as Parliamentary Under-Secretary of State for Air from 1951 to 1952, Parliamentary Secretary to the Ministry of Defence from 1952 to 1954, Minister of Works from October 1954 to December 1955, Secretary of State for Air from December 1955 to January 1957 and Economic Secretary to the Treasury from 1957 to 1958.

His resignation in 1958, along with that of the Chancellor of the Exchequer Peter Thorneycroft and fellow Treasury Minister Enoch Powell, was described by Harold Macmillan as "little local difficulties". He exacted his revenge when, in the wake of the Profumo scandal, he attacked the Macmillan government and quoted in his memorable speech the devastating words of Robert Browning on William Wordsworth: "Never glad confident morning again".

His speech showed Macmillan as weak and out of touch, and it sealed Birch's reputation of being as deadly as Leo Amery.

In 1950 he married Esmé Glyn, the daughter of the 4th Baron Wolverton.

In 1955, he was appointed a Privy Counsellor, and on 7 July 1970, he was created a life peer as Baron Rhyl, of Holywell in the parish of Swanmore in the County of Southampton.

References

Sources
Who Was Who

External links 
 

1906 births
1981 deaths
British Army personnel of World War II
King's Royal Rifle Corps officers
Conservative Party (UK) MPs for Welsh constituencies
Rhyl 
Members of the Privy Council of the United Kingdom
Rhyl
People educated at Eton College
Secretaries of State for Air (UK)
UK MPs 1945–1950
UK MPs 1950–1951
UK MPs 1951–1955
UK MPs 1955–1959
UK MPs 1959–1964
UK MPs 1964–1966
UK MPs 1966–1970
UK MPs who were granted peerages
Ministers in the third Churchill government, 1951–1955
Ministers in the Eden government, 1955–1957
Ministers in the Macmillan and Douglas-Home governments, 1957–1964
Life peers created by Elizabeth II